Venla Hovi (born 28 October 1987) is a Finnish retired ice hockey forward and the current head coach of the Metropolitan Riveters in the Premier Hockey Federation (PHF). She played with the Finnish national team and won bronze medals at the 2010 and 2018 Winter Olympic Games and at the 2008, 2009, and 2017 IIHF Women's World Championships, and a silver medal at the 2019 IIHF Women's World Championship. Hovi announced her retirement from top athletic competition the day following the achievement of silver at the 2019 Worlds.

Following her retirement, Hovi served as an on-ice instructor with True North, the Winnipeg Jets' hockey development program. She was the first woman ever to be hired as a coach by the organization and was one of a small number of women employed as on-ice instructors in the NHL or NHL affiliated programs.

Playing career
In her native Finland, Hovi played in the Naisten SM-sarja (Women's Finnish Championship Series) with Ylöjärvi Ilves, Tampereen Ilves, HPK Hameenlinna, and KalPa Kuopio.

Canada
Hovi played in Canada with the University of Manitoba Bisons of U Sports. Playing out of the Wayne Fleming Arena in Winnipeg, Manitoba. Her contributions helped the Bisons defeat the University of Western Ontario Mustangs in the 2018 U Sports Women's Ice Hockey Championship and secure the team's first Golden Path Trophy. She was additionally recognized at the University of Manitoba as the 2017–18 Bison Sports Female Athlete of the Year.

Hovi played with the Calgary Inferno of the Canadian Women's Hockey League (CWHL) for the 2018–19 season. Coincidentally, she would score the first goal of her CWHL career against her Finnish national team teammate, Noora Räty, in a game versus the Shenzhen KRS Rays. Qualifying for the 2019 Clarkson Cup Finals, the Inferno would defeat Les Canadiennes de Montreal by a 5–2 tally to win the second Cup in franchise history. With the win, Hovi became the first player from Finland to win the Clarkson Cup.

Personal life 
Hovi has a Bachelor's degree in Communications and Applied Linguistics from the University of Vaasa. She studied in the post graduate program for Teaching English as a Second or Foreign Language at the University of Manitoba.

For the 2018–19 season she served as assistant coach to the Manitoba Bisons women's ice hockey program.

As of July 2019, Hovi had been hired by True North as a coach in the Winnipeg Jets' Hockey Development program. She was the first woman ever to be hired as a coach by the organization and one of a small number of women working as on-ice instructors in any capacity for a NHL organization. She will be working alongside other instructors to teach players of all ages and skill levels. Reflecting on her new role, Hovi said, "It's been different but also a really fun change for myself. I don't think I should be limited to just coaching females. Same thing, Dave [Cameron (True North head on-ice instructor)] shouldn't just be coaching guys."

Career statistics

Awards and honors
Manitoba Bisons Female Athlete of the Year (2017-18)
Player of the Game, Gold Medal Game, 2018 U SPORTS Women’s Hockey Championship

References

External links

1987 births
Living people
Calgary Inferno players
Clarkson Cup champions
Competitors at the 2011 Winter Universiade
Finnish ice hockey coaches
Finnish expatriate ice hockey people in Canada
Finnish expatriate ice hockey players in Canada
Finnish expatriate ice hockey players in Denmark
Finnish expatriate ice hockey coaches in the United States
Finnish expatriate ice hockey players in the United States
Finnish women's ice hockey forwards
HPK Kiekkonaiset players
Ice hockey people from Tampere
Ice hockey players at the 2010 Winter Olympics
Ice hockey players at the 2014 Winter Olympics
Ice hockey players at the 2018 Winter Olympics
Ilves Naiset players
KalPa Naiset players
Manitoba Bisons women's ice hockey players
Medalists at the 2010 Winter Olympics
Medalists at the 2018 Winter Olympics
Niagara Purple Eagles athletes
Olympic bronze medalists for Finland
Olympic ice hockey players of Finland
Olympic medalists in ice hockey
Premier Hockey Federation coaches
Universiade medalists in ice hockey
Universiade silver medalists for Finland